"Breakdown" is a song by the English post-punk band Clock DVA. It was the second single released in support of their third album Advantage.

Formats and track listing 
All lyrics written by Adi Newton, all music composed by Clock DVA, except "Black Angel's Death Song" by Lou Reed and John Cale.
UK 7" single (POSP 627)
 "Breakdown" – 3:48
 "Black Angel's Death Song" (The Velvet Underground cover) – 3:22

UK 12" single (EMC 1206)
 "Breakdown" (extended version) – 5:47
 "Breakdown" – 3:50
 "Beautiful Losers" – 4:29
 "Black Angels Death Song" (The Velvet Underground cover) – 3:24

Accolades

Personnel 
Adapted from the Breakdown liner notes.

Clock DVA
 Paul Browse – saxophone
 John Valentine Carruthers – guitar
 Dean Dennis – bass guitar
 Adi Newton – vocals, trumpet
 Nick Sanderson – drums, percussion

Additional musicians
 Katie Kissoon – backing vocals
Production and additional personnel
 Peter Anderson – photography
 Peter Barrett – design
 Hugh Jones – production, engineering, mixing

Release history

References

External links 
 

1983 songs
1983 singles
Clock DVA songs
Polydor Records singles
Relativity Records singles
Song recordings produced by Hugh Jones (producer)